The men's road race at the 1986 UCI Road World Championships was the 53rd edition of the event. The race took place on Sunday 6 September 1986 in Colorado Springs, United States. The race was won by Moreno Argentin of Italy.

Final classification

References

Men's Road Race
UCI Road World Championships – Men's road race
1986 Super Prestige Pernod International